Henry Price (5 May 1819 – 12 December 1863) was a British musician and painter who specialized in landscape watercolors. After studying painting and violin in London, he went to New York, where he married Elisa Castello, a Colombian. In 1841, they moved to Bogotá, Colombia. In 1847, he co-founded the Philharmonic Society of Bogotá (la Sociedad Filarmónica de Bogotá) and its music school (Escuela de Música).

He participated in the third phase of the Comisión Corográfica (1850–1859), led by Agustín Codazzi, who replaced the Venezuelan painter Carmelo Fernández. The Comisión Corográfica had been founded according to an 1839 law with the mission of creating an official map of Colombia and studying the country's geography. On his trip from Santa Marta to Bogotá together with the Comisión Corográfica, between January and August 1858, he painted the people who lived on the banks of the Magdalena River. He was a renowned landscape artist. His watercolors reflected the scenes and social customs he saw.

During his travels, he became hemiplegic. According to his family, he was poisoned by his watercolor pigments. He was replaced by a Colombian artist, Manuel María Paz. He returned to New York where he died in Brooklyn on 12 December 1863 at age 44.

References

External links 

 Wikimedia Commons has a multimedia category for Henry Price.
 La Biblioteca Nacional de Colombia has art from the Comisión Corográfica.

19th-century British painters
British male painters
Landscape artists
1819 births
1863 deaths
19th-century British male artists